Philip Twysden (1713–1752), was an Anglican clergyman who served in the Church of Ireland as Lord Bishop of Raphoe from 1747 to 1752. The circumstances of his death later became the subject of scandalous rumour.

Early life and family 
He was born in Kent, south-east England, in 1713, the third son of Sir William Twysden, 5th Baronet of Roydon Hall, East Peckham, Kent, by his wife (and distant cousin) Jane Twisden.

He studied at University College, Oxford, from 1732. He was awarded a Master of Arts degree, and the honorary degree of Doctor of Civil Law in 1745.

He married twice: firstly to Mary Purcell (died 1743), and secondly to Frances Carter, daughter of The Rt Hon. Thomas Carter, Master of the Rolls in Ireland. After Bishop Twysden's death, she married her cousin, General James Johnston.

By his second wife, he had two children: Mary (died in infancy) and a posthumous daughter called Frances (1753–1821). Frances, later Countess of Jersey, was one of the many mistresses of King George IV when he was Prince of Wales.

Ecclesiastical career 
He was ordained a priest in the Church of England. He was instituted in 1738 as rector of Eard and in 1745, for a short time, served as the rector of Eastling in Kent. He accompanied The 4th Earl of Chesterfield to Dublin as his chaplain, upon the Earl's appointment as Lord Lieutenant of Ireland.

Twysden was nominated to the Bishopric of Raphoe in Ulster on 3 March 1746 and was consecrated by the Lord Archbishop of Dublin, assisted by the bishops of Derry and Clonfert, at St Michan's Church, Dublin, on 29 March 1747.

Death 
Bishop Twysden died on 2 November 1752 at home in Jermyn Street, St James's, London. However, according to Henry Cotton, he died at Roydon Hall, East Peckham, his father's country house. He was buried in the south chancel of St Michael's Church, East Peckham, under a plain stone with no inscription.

A story grew up that, having been made bankrupt, he was shot while attempting to rob a stagecoach. The location of his alleged attempted career as a highwayman was either Hounslow Heath (west of London) or Wrotham Heath in Kent.

Notes

References

 
 
 

1713 births
Alumni of University College, Oxford
Anglican bishops of Raphoe
18th-century Anglican bishops in Ireland
1752 deaths